The bunny hop is typically one of the first jumps learned by beginning figure skaters. It is a non-rotational jump performed while skating forward in a straight line.

The skater approaches the jump by stroking forward in a straight line, steps onto the left foot, then jumps up off the ice with the right leg scissoring forward and up past the left leg. The landing is on the toe picks of the right foot, immediately pushing onto the left foot. It is possible to do bunny hops in series on the same foot, or to alternate feet.

In addition to being used to introduce beginners to jumping, bunny hops are sometimes used by advanced skaters as a connecting move or as a small leap for choreographic effect.

Figure skating elements